Emil Radev is a Bulgarian politician currently serving as a Member of the European Parliament for the Citizens for European Development of Bulgaria.

References

Living people
MEPs for Bulgaria 2019–2024
GERB MEPs
GERB politicians
Year of birth missing (living people)